John Kirby  (born 1949 in Liverpool, England) is a British artist known for his paintings exploring issues of gender, religion, sexuality, and race. His work has been compared to that of René Magritte, Balthus and Edward Hopper. Kirby has exhibited internationally and his work is held in several collections including the Tate Gallery, the Victoria & Albert Museum, and the Royal College of Art.

Early life 

John Kirby was born in Liverpool in 1949 and grew up in Tuebrook. He was raised Irish Catholic and attended Saint Cecilia’s primary school as well as serving as an altar boy. When he was 16, Kirby left Liverpool to work in London as a shipping clerk and then traveled to Calcutta to help in a children’s home headed by Mother Teresa. After moving back to Liverpool, he trained as a social worker and then worked as a probation officer before enrolling in art school at the age of 33.

Career 

Kirby trained at Central Saint Martins and the Royal College of Art in London. He has created a large body of work that includes both painting and sculpture and has cited his religious background as a strong influence, as well as the “ambiguity of sex and gender” in his work.
Kirby’s first major retrospective was held at the Walker Art Gallery in 2012, with more than fifty of his paintings and several of his sculptures. His work has been described as “bleak and lonely” and dominated by “solitary figures in strange worlds.”

Solo exhibitions 

2014 Play Time, Flowers Cork Street, London 
2013 John Kirby, Flowers New York
2012 The Living and the Dead, Walker Art Gallery, Liverpool 
2011 Ghosts, Flowers Cork Street, London
2010 What Remains, Flowers East, London
2009 Home, Flowers Cork Street, London
2007 Being Alive, Flowers Cork Street, London
2006 Mixed Blood, Flowers, New York
2006 Il Polittico, Rome
2005 Absent Friends, Flowers Cork Street, London
2005 New prints and monotypes, Flowers Graphics, London
2003 Someone Else Flowers, New York 
2002 Flowers Cork Street, London 
2002 Paintings, Flowers West, Santa Monica, California
2000 New Prints and Monoprints, Flowers Graphics, London 
2000 Il Polittico, Rome
1999 Lost Children, Flowers East, London
1998 Lost Children, Flowers West, Santa Monica, California
1997 In the Dark, Flowers East, London
1997 John Kirby, Il Polittico, Rome
1996 Art Basel 27, Switzerland 
1995 The Company of Strangers, Ferens Art Gallery, Hull 
1994 The Company of Strangers, Flowers East, London 
1993 The Sign of the Cross, Angela Flowers Gallery, London 
1992 Homeland, Flowers East, London
1991 Homeland, Lannon Cole Gallery, Chicago
1991 New York and Related Works, Flowers East, London
1989 Still Lives, Flowers East, London 
1988 Other People's Lives, Angela Flowers (Ireland) Inc., Co.Cork 
1988 Other People's Lives, Angela Flowers (Ireland) Inc., Co.Cork 
1987 Artist of the Day, Angela Flowers Gallery, London

Public collections

Contemporary Art Society 
Ferens Art Gallery, Hull 
Irish Contemporary Art Society 
John Hansard Gallery, University of Southampton 
Royal College of Art Collection 
Tate Gallery, London 
University College of Wales, Aberystwyth 
Victoria & Albert Museum 
René Magritte Foundation, Brussels

In popular culture

Kirby's "Self Portrait 1987" is seen on-screen, and referenced by the character Armand Goldman (Robin Williams) in the 1996 film The Birdcage. In an early scene, Armand defends the fine art to his son, Val (Dan Futterman), who requests his father tone down the décor exclaiming "The Kirby? That's art!"

References

External links 
 Flowers Gallery, John Kirby
 Artnet, John Kirby

20th-century British painters
British male painters
21st-century British painters
1949 births
Living people
20th-century British sculptors
British male sculptors
People from Tuebrook
20th-century British male artists
21st-century British male artists